Wat Ku Tao ("Temple of the Gourd Pagoda") is a Buddhist temple in Chiang Mai, Thailand. The temple was built in 1613 to enshrine the remains of Nawrahta Minsaw, the first Burmese ruler of Lan Na. The temple is known for its distinctive chedi, which was built in the Yunnanese style, arranged in a series of five diminishing spheres that represent the five historical and future Buddhas. The temple presently caters to Chiang Mai's Shan community.

References

External links

Ku Tao